Meadow River Lumber Company No. 1 is a Shay locomotive at Steamtown National Historic Site, in Scranton, Pennsylvania.  This 2-truck Shay was built by Lima Locomotive Works in 1910.  This type of locomotive was used primarily by lumber and mining companies.  Some were used by other industries and on short lines.  This is one of 77 Shay locomotives preserved in the United States.

In 1907, John and T.W. Raines began construction on a lumber mill in Greenbrier County, West Virginia, under the name of the Meadow River Lumber Company.  The location had no access to a railway so the Sewell Valley Railroad was incorporated. Twenty miles of track was laid between the Chesapeake and Ohio Railroad at Meadow Creek to the site of the mill. The mill opened in September 1910 and this locomotive was purchased by the new railroad.  It was called Sewell Valley Railroad No. 1.

With a capacity of cutting  of lumber per day, the Meadow River Lumber Company became the world's largest hardwood manufacturer.  At first the railroad was operated separately from its parent company. However, changes in the tax code lead the two to merge therefore, "Meadow River Lumber Company No. 1, spent her entire career as the property of this single lumber enterprise [sic] even though she operated there under two different names."

While at Steamtown, U.S.A. in Bellows Falls, Vermont, the locomotive endured extensive damage when the building it was stored in collapsed under heavy snow in February 1982. The Shay's wooden cab was destroyed. By then it was already missing "its sand dome, its headlight, its front number plate, its bell and bell hanger, whistle, and other components". Canadian Pacific Railway No. 1293 was also damaged in the roof collapse.  

It was determined that it would remain at the National Historic Site as it was the only Shay and the only geared locomotive in the collection.

References

External links 
Meadow River Lumber Company No. 1 at the National Park Service

Lima locomotives
Geared steam locomotives
Individual locomotives of the United States
Standard gauge locomotives of the United States
Railway locomotives introduced in 1910
Preserved steam locomotives of Pennsylvania